Al Wusta Governorate (also known as 'The Central Governorate'), is one of the governorates of Oman. Its capital city is Haima.

Provinces
The region of Al Wusta Governorate consists of four 'Wilayat' (provinces):
Haima
Duqm
Mahout
Al Jazer

Demographics

Health institutions
The region has numerous health institutions in each 'wilayat':
Haima Hospital
CDC Haima
Al Ajaiz Health Centre
Duqm Hospital
Haitham Health Centre
Ras Madrika Health Centre
Mahout Health Centre
Khloof Health Centre
Nigda Health Centre
Sorab Health Centre
Al Jazir Hospital
Liqbi Health Centre
North Ghoubra Health Centre
South Ghoubra Health Centre

References

 
Governorates of Oman